Connecticut's 150th House of Representatives district elects one member of the Connecticut House of Representatives. It encompasses parts of Greenwich and has been represented by Democrat Steve Meskers since 2019.

List of representatives

Recent Elections

2022

2020

2018

2016

2014

2012

References

150